Albinus (Albin) Asikainen (24 March 1873, Mikkelin maalaiskunta – 15 November 1948) was a Finnish farmer and politician. He was a member of the Parliament of Finland from 1929 to 1948, representing the Agrarian League.

References

1873 births
1948 deaths
People from Mikkeli
People from Mikkeli Province (Grand Duchy of Finland)
Centre Party (Finland) politicians
Members of the Parliament of Finland (1929–30)
Members of the Parliament of Finland (1930–33)
Members of the Parliament of Finland (1933–36)
Members of the Parliament of Finland (1936–39)
Members of the Parliament of Finland (1939–45)
Members of the Parliament of Finland (1945–48)
Finnish people of World War II